Karitsa is a rural locality (a settlement) in Tolshmenskoye Rural Settlement, Totemsky  District, Vologda Oblast, Russia. The population was 475 as of 2002. There are 10 streets.

Geography 
Karitsa is located 107 km south of Totma (the district's administrative centre) by road. Pervomaysky is the nearest rural locality.

References 

Rural localities in Tarnogsky District